2015 in continental European music in geographical order.

Scandinavia
Main article for Scandinavian music in 2015

Denmark
Main article for Danish music in 2015
Denmark in the Eurovision Song Contest 2015
Danish #1s 2015
At the nonprofit Roskilde Festival acts are Paul McCartney, Florence + the Machine, Kendrick Lamar, Muse, Noel Gallagher's High Flying Birds, Pharrell Williams and Nicki Minaj
Lukas Graham's "Lukas Graham (Blue Album)" is a #1 just like its singles "7 Years" and "Strip No More".

Finland
Main article for Finnish music in 2015
Finland in the Eurovision Song Contest 2015
Finnish #1 singles2015, #1 albums
Hiphoppers Teflon Brothers had a #1 with "Pämppää"
Rap duo JVG topped the charts with "Tarkenee".
Rapper Cheek had a #1 album Alpha Omega and a #1 single Sä huudat.

Norway
Main article for Norwegian music in 2015
Norway in the Eurovision Song Contest 2015
Norway charts 2015
Tungevaag & Raaban's "Samsara 2015" is a hit in Scandinavia, in Finland it reaches #1.
Kygo, a DJ, had several #1s with Firestone, Stole the Show (also #1 in Sweden and France) and Nothing Left
 Madcon's, Don't worry ends #1 in Hungary, Czech Republic and is charted in various other European countries.

Sweden
Main article for Swedish music in 2015
Sweden in the Eurovision Song Contest 2015
Swedish #1 singles and albums
Måns Zelmerlöw won the Eurovision Song Contest 2015 with his song Heroes. It topped the charts in Sweden, Greece, Iceland and Poland.
Waiting for Love, Aviciis latest single, was a #1 in Sweden, Norway, Austria and Hungary.
17 year old Zara Larsson had a #1 song with Lush Life, also a top 5 hit in many European countries.
Axwell and Ingrosso's Sun Is Shining, ended #1 on the Sverigetopplistan and it also reached top 10s in The Netherlands, Norway, Belgium and Finland.

Netherlands
Dutch #1 singles
Kenneth Bron ("Kenny B) of Surinamese origin was #1 for 11 weeks with "Parijs".
"Drank & Drugs" from Lil' Kleine and Ronnie Flex spent three weeks at number one.

Belgium (two different charts for Flanders and Wallonie)
DJ Felix De Laet's project Lost Frequencies have a major hit with a cover of Easton Corbin's Are You with Me. It was a #1 in Belgium, Ireland, UK, Sweden, Finland, Romania, Poland, Germany, Switzerland and Austria. The follow up hit "Reality" was a #1 in Belgium, Austria, Germany and Poland.
Casting star Loïc Nottet had his first #1 with "Rhythm Inside" (in both parts of the country) and represented Belgium in Eurovision 2015 and came 5th overall
DJ brothers Dimitri Vegas & Like Mike had two #1s in "The Hum"(vs. Ummet Ozcan) and "Higher Place"(featuring Ne-Yo) in Flanders.

UK and Ireland
Main article for Irish music in 2015
Main article for British music in 2015

Germany
German number ones 2015
Essen's controversial rapper Favorite had his first #1 album with Neues von Gott (Selfmade Records)., Hamburg's fun rappers Deichkind also have their first #1 album with "Niveau weshalb warum" even though both its singles don't enter the Top20. Two hiphoppers from Berlin also have charttopping albums without hit singles, Fler aka "Frank White" is #1 with "Keiner kommt klar mit mir", Bushido's album is called "Carlo Cokxxx Nutten 3".
Crooner Wolfgang Petry had a #1 album with "Brandneu".
20-year-old DJ Felix Jaehn remixes Jamaican OMI's song Cheerleader which became a #1 in numerous countries. He also produces Jasmine Thompson's cover version of Ain't Nobody which became a  #1 in Germany and eight other countries.
Sarah Connor's album Muttersprache topped the German and Swiss charts.
Rapper Cro had his third #1 with "ByeBye", it also cracked the Swiss and Austrian top ten. 
Kurdish rapper Xatar, fresh out of jail after being part of a €1.7 mio robbery, had a #1 album with "Baba aller Babas".
Anna Naklab and Alle Farben are #2 in Germany and #1 in Austria with a cover of Supergirl.
Lindemann featuring Rammstein frontman Till Lindemann and Swede Peter Tägtgren published the album Skills in Pills. It's a #1 in Finland and Germany.
Electronic DJ and producer Robin Schulz' new hit Sugar ft Canadian Francesco Yates was #1 in Germany and Austria.
Rapper Sido's first ever #1 single was a collaboration with Andreas Bourani titled "Astronaut"; it also topped the Swiss and Austrian charts.
Ann Sophie who replaced qualifier Andreas Kümmert failed to get a single point at the ESC with her song Black Smoke (written by British pop singer Ella Eyre)

Switzerland and Austria
Swiss #1s
Sophie Hunger had her third #1 album, "Supermoon" is also #6 in Germany.
Austria #1 singles
Folk singer Andreas Gabalier had his fourth platinum album in a row with Mountain Man. It's also #1 in Germany and Switzerland.
Electro swing DJ Parov Stelar had his first #1 album, a German #8, with "The Demon Diaries"

France
French #1s 2015
Both Louane Emera's single Avenir and her album Chambre 12 reached the #1 position.
Talent show winner Marina Kaye became #1 with Homeless
Deep House DJ "Feder" from Nice had a #1 in France, Switzerland and Hungary with Goodbye.
Mylene Farmer and Sting had a #1 with Stolen Car

Portugal
Pop rappers D.A.M.A are the breakthrough Portuguese act; their album "Uma Questão De Princípio" is #1 for 19 weeks. The singer and composer Agir wins the MTV award for Best Portuguese Act.

Spain
American Nicky Jam's #1 single El Perdon featured Spanish singer Enrique Iglesias, it also topped the Swiss, Dutch and Italian charts.
In June, Enrique Iglesias injured his hand in Tijuana as he tried to grab a drone that was filming his concert.
Álvaro Soler had an Italian and Swiss #1 with El mismo sol.

Italy
Italian number ones 2015
Operatic pop trio Il Volo represented Italy at the ESC with their #1 Grande amore and came third overall.
Eros Ramazzotti's thirteenth studio album Perfetto is #1 in Italy and top 5 in many other European countries.
Rapper Baby K featuring Giusy Ferreri had a platinum hit with Roma-Bangkok
German-speaking Frei.Wild's album "Opposition" is a #1 in Germany and Austria and #2 in Switzerland, the singles "Unvergessen, unvergänglich, lebenslänglich" and "Wir brechen eure Seelen" reach the German top 10.

Eastern Europe/ Balkans
List of Polish #1 singles
Czech #1 singles
Hungarian #1 singles
Hungary's Sziget Festival featured Robbie Williams, Kings of Leon, Ellie Goulding, Limp Bizkit, Major Lazer
Albanian singer Elhaida Dani participated in the ESC with "I'm Alive"; it charted in Macedonia, was a #1 in Albania and also made the top 100 in Iceland, Belgium and Montenegro
Estonian duo Elina Born & Stig Rästa got a Eurovision hit named Goodbye To Yesterday charted 1 in Estonia and charted in top 10 in Finland, Austria and Russia.

Musical films
The Lure (Poland), starring Marta Mazurek and Michalina Olszańska.

Deaths
29 January – Maurizio Arcieri, Italian singer (The New Dada and Krisma), 72
1 February – Aldo Ciccolini, Italian-born French pianist, 89
12 February – Désiré Dondeyne, French composer, 93 
17 February – Andrzej Koszewski, Polish composer, 92
12 March – Erol Büyükburç, Turkish pop music composer and singer, 78
20 April – Richard Anthony, 77, Egyptian-French singer-songwriter 
14 June – Boris Godjunov, Bulgarian singer, 74
27 June – Chris Squire, best known as the English bassist and founding member of the Progressive Rock band Yes
2 July – Slavko Avsenik, Slovene composer and folk musician, 85
16 September – Guy Béart, French singer-songwriter, 85
19 December – Kurt Masur, German conductor, 88

References

2015 in music